Events from the year 1939 in Ireland.

Incumbents
 President: Douglas Hyde
 Taoiseach: Éamon de Valera (FF)

Events
 11 January – the Congress of the Irish National Teachers' Organisation in Galway called on the Government to abolish the ban on married women teachers.
 12 February – the Department of External Affairs announced that it recognised the government of Francisco Franco in Spain.
 February – in his Lenten pastoral, Bishop Daniel Mageean referred to "A Protestant Parliament for a Protestant People".
 12 March – Taoiseach Éamon de Valera attended the coronation of Pope Pius XII in Rome.
 16 March – Éamon de Valera was greeted by Benito Mussolini in Rome and a luncheon was held in his honour.
 22 March – Irish neutrality was discussed during a Dáil debate on defence estimates. The Government considered the implications for the export market to Britain if a neutral stand was taken.
 30 March – the Treason Bill passed its fifth and final stage in Dáil Éireann.
 9 April – the Gaelic Athletic Association voted to keep the name of the President, Douglas Hyde, off its list of patrons. The situation arose when Hyde attended an international soccer game.
 15 April – boxer Jack Doyle married Mexican film actress Movita Castaneda in a civil ceremony in Ensenada, Baja California, Mexico.
 17 April – the Prime Minister of Northern Ireland, Lord Craigavon, dismissed as cowardly the Irish Government's position of neutrality.
 19 April – in a speech to Seanad Éireann Taoiseach Éamon de Valera referred to the dropping of all references to the King and Great Britain from new Irish passports.
 30 April – 1939 New York World's Fair opened with an Ireland pavilion designed by Michael Scott.
 4 May – the Prime Minister of Northern Ireland announced that conscription would not be extended to Northern Ireland.
 18 May – the Earl of Iveagh presented the Government with his townhouse in Dublin.
 2 June – the Treason Act 1939 became law: a sentence of death could be passed on anyone convicted of "levying war against the State."
 29 June – Clann na Talmhan, the National Agricultural Party, was founded in Athenry.
 1 July – the Irish Red Cross Society was established.
 1 September – a state of emergency was declared by the Government.
 2 September – Taoiseach Éamon de Valera told the Dáil that Ireland will remain neutral in the European War.
 3 September – the Emergency Powers Act 1939 came into force as Britain and France declared war on Nazi Germany. The Marine and Coastwatching Service was set up. British liner  became the first civilian casualty of the war when she was torpedoed and sunk by German submarine  between Rockall and Tory Island; the Knut Nelson (Norway) landed 450 of the survivors in Galway.
 18 September – John F. Kennedy flew from Foynes for his first transatlantic flight, to Port Washington, New York, after helping with arrangements for survivors of the SS Athenia.
 9 September – billed as "The Last Race in Europe" until after World War II, the Irish Motor Racing Club held its Phoenix Park Race; this included motorcycle and car races.
 11 September – the Irish-flagged tanker Inverliffey was shelled and sunk by the Nazi submarine, . The U-boat towed the lifeboats away from the blazing oil.
 13 September – the Minister for Supplies, Seán Lemass, introduced petrol rationing.
 6 October – Austrian theoretical physicist Erwin Schrödinger took up residence in Dublin at the invitation of Éamon de Valera.
 30 October – more than two dozen air-raid sirens, acquired by Dublin Corporation, were tested across Dublin City.
 November – the teenage Brendan Behan, at this time a member of the Irish Republican Army, was arrested in Liverpool for possession of explosives.
 December – the Supreme Court of Ireland declared the detention without trial of Irish Republican Army members to be illegal.
 10 December – the German Nazi propaganda radio station Irland-Redaktion began broadcasting to Ireland in the Irish language.
 23 December – a million rounds of ammunition were stolen from the national arsenal at the Phoenix Park by the Irish Republican Army.

Arts and literature
 31 January – Lord Longford began a series of Chekhov productions at the Gate Theatre in Dublin with The Cherry Orchard.
 February – English novelist T. H. White settled at Doolistown in County Meath; he lived in Ireland until 1946.
 13 March – Flann O'Brien's At Swim-Two-Birds was published in London.
 4 May – James Joyce's Finnegans Wake was published complete in London.
 18 May – Louis MacNeice's Autumn Journal: a poem was published in London.
 July – W. B. Yeats' Last Poems and Two Plays were published posthumously in London.
 10 October – Robert Collis's play Marrowbone Lane was premiered at the Gate Theatre, Dublin, starring Wilfrid Brambell.
 Autumn
 English painters Kenneth Hall and his lover Basil Rakoczi of The White Stag group moved from London to Ireland.
 English novelist Ethel Mannin settled in Connemara.
 English-born Irish composer Elizabeth Maconchy returned to Ireland from England, living in Dublin for a brief period, during which she composed her Fifth String Quartet.
 Peig Sayers' stories and anecdotes about life on Great Blasket Island are published as Maċtnaṁ seana-ṁná in Dublin.

Sport

Football

League of Ireland
Winners: Shamrock Rovers
FAI Cup
Winners: Shelbourne 1–1, 1–0 Sligo Rovers. English footballer, Dixie Dean played in the final for Rovers.

Golf
 Irish Open was won by Arthur Lees (England).

Births
 7 January – Tom Kiernan, rugby player and coach.
 25 January – Dermot Clifford, Roman Catholic Archbishop of the Archdiocese of Cashel and Emly.
 2 February – Desmond O'Malley, politician, TD (1968–2002) and leader of the Progressive Democrats (1985-1993) (died 2021).
 19 February – Ted Carroll, Kilkenny hurler (died 1995).
 25 March – Tom Fitzgerald, Fianna Fáil Senator.
 1 April – Joe Jacob, Fianna Fáil TD and Minister of State.
 11 April – Joe Burke, accordionist (died 2021).
 13 April – Seamus Heaney, poet (died 2013).
 24 April – Joe McCartin, Member of the European Parliament, Senator.
 3 May – Ken Hope, cricketer.
 9 May – Pádraig Flynn, Fianna Fáil TD, Cabinet Minister and European Commissioner.
 19 May – John Sheahan, violinist, folk musician and composer, with The Dubliners.
 29 May – Mary Banotti, Fine Gael politician.
 25 June – Garech Browne, patron of the arts (died 2018).
 11 July – Mick Brown, football scout.
 16 August – Seán Brady, Archbishop of Armagh and Primate of All Ireland.
 21 August – Ray McLoughlin, international rugby player.
 5 September – Mark Killilea Jnr, Fianna Fáil TD and Member of the European Parliament.
 10 September – Edward Plunkett, 20th Baron of Dunsany, artist.
 12 September – Patrick Harrington, Bishop of the Roman Catholic Diocese of Lodwar in Kenya.
 11 October – Austin Currie, founder-member of the Social Democratic and Labour Party and Fine Gael TD (died 2021).
 16 October – Joe Dolan, singer (died 2007).
 27 October – Thady Wyndham-Quin, 7th Earl of Dunraven and Mount-Earl, peer.
 October – Frank Columb, writer.
 2 November – John Buckley, Bishop of Cork and Ross (1997 – ).
 November – Ollie Conmy, international soccer player.
 16 December – Barney McKenna, musician.
Full date unknown
 Michael Coady, poet, short story writer, local historian, genealogist, photographer, journalist and musician.
 Paddy FitzGerald, Cork hurler.
 Alice Hanratty, painter and printmaker.
 Paddy Moran, Kilkenny hurler.
 Denis Murphy, Cork hurler.
 Éamonn O'Doherty, sculptor (died 2011).

Deaths
 28 January – W. B. Yeats, poet and dramatist, in France (born 1865).
 2 February – Amanda McKittrick Ros, novelist and poet (born 1860).
 9 May – Mary Williams, previously Mary, Lady Heath, aviator, athlete and writer (born 1896).
 9 June – Owen Moore, actor (born 1886).
 28 June – James Charles Dowdall, businessman and independent member of the 1922 Seanad (born 1873).
 19 July – John Cassidy, sculptor and painter (born 1860).
 20 August – Edward Bulfin, British general during World War I (born 1862).
 8 September – Maurice George Moore, soldier and independent member of the 1922 Seanad (born 1854).
 15 September – William MacCarthy-Morrogh, cricketer (born 1870).
 20 September – Andrew Claude de la Cherois Crommelin, astronomer (born 1865).
 10 November – Charlotte Despard, suffragist, novelist and Sinn Féin activist (born 1844).
 14 December – Samuel Lombard Brown, independent member of 1922 Seanad and barrister (born 1858).

References

 
1930s in Ireland
Ireland
Independent Ireland in World War II
Years of the 20th century in Ireland